FK Slavija Pržino is a football club from the town Pržino near Skopje, Republic of Macedonia. They currently play in the OFS Kisela Voda league.

History
The club was founded in 1919. It stands as the only club that still competes in Macedonian football and to have won a title in the Skoplje Football Subassociation, which they won in 1935.

Recent seasons

References

External links
Club info at MacedonianFootball 
Club info at MakFudbal 
Fan Club Forum 
Football Federation of Macedonia 

Football clubs in North Macedonia
Association football clubs established in 1919
FK Slavija Skopje